Bergendahl may refer to:

Adam Bergendahl (born 1994), Swedish ice hockey player
Anna Bergendahl (born 1991), Swedish singer
Frederick Bergendahl (1858–1889), United States Army private
Lars Bergendahl (1909–1997), Norwegian cross country skier 
Lauritz Bergendahl (1887–1964), Norwegian Nordic skier
Waldemar Bergendahl (1933-2022), Swedish film producer